Nouman Sarwar (born 2 August 1984) is a cricketer who plays for the Qatar national cricket team. He made his Twenty20 International (T20I) debut for Qatar against Saudi Arabia on 21 January 2019 in the 2019 ACC Western Region T20 tournament.

References

External links
 

1984 births
Living people
Qatari cricketers
Qatar Twenty20 International cricketers
Pakistani expatriates in Qatar
Place of birth missing (living people)